The Red Hill River is a  river in the Lakes Region of central New Hampshire in the United States. It is a tributary of Lake Winnipesaukee, part of the Merrimack River watershed.

The Red Hill River begins in the town of Sandwich, New Hampshire, at the outlet of Little Pond Red Hill Pond, just east of the village of Sandwich. The river flows north into Red Hill Pond, then turns west to flow past the village of Center Sandwich. The river then turns south and flows through a series of wetlands, into Moultonborough. The river passes through Garland Pond and drops in a short river segment past the hamlet of Moultonborough Falls to Lees Pond, the outlet of which leads almost directly into an arm of Moultonborough Bay on Lake Winnipesaukee.

See also

List of rivers of New Hampshire

References

Tributaries of the Merrimack River
Rivers of New Hampshire
Rivers of Carroll County, New Hampshire